The Thai National Anthem is the title of Thailand's national anthem, which was adopted in its current form on 10 December 1939. It replaced "Sansoen Phra Barami" in 1932, which remains as the royal anthem of Thailand. The melody was composed by Phra Chenduriyang (Peter Feit), and the words were made by Luang Saranupraphan. Phleng chāt, literally meaning "national anthem", is a general term for a national anthem. The term is also used to refer to this specific song.

Periodization

Historical background

National anthem before 1932
Before 1932, Sansoen Phra Barami (the Royal Anthem) was used as the national anthem of Siam.

National anthem after 1932

The anthem was composed a few days after the revolution of 1932 in the tune vaguely similar to the national anthem of Poland, Poland Is Not Yet Lost, and was first broadcast in July 1932. The original lyrics were by Khun Wichitmatra.

Phleng Chat Siam (Khun Wichitmatra lyrics, 1932–1934)

First national anthem competition (1934)
In 1934, Thai government launched competitions for the official national anthem, for both melody and lyrics. Changwang Tua Phathayakoson (จางวางทั่ว พัทยโกศล) composed a tune in a traditional style called Phleng Maha Nimit, but Phra Chenduriyang's melody was selected because it sounded more modern.

Second national anthem competition
After that, in the competition for the lyrics with Phra Chenduriyang's music, the original words by Khun Wichitmatra took first prize. They were in use until 1939, with a minor edit and an additional version written by second prize winner Chan Khamvilai (ฉันท์ ขำวิไล) adopted in 1934.

Phleng Chat Siam (Chan Khamvilai lyrics, 1934–1939)

Thai Cultural Revolution
In 1939, when the name of the country was changed from Siam to Thailand, a competition was launched to create new lyrics, with those by Luang Saranupraphan winning. Thai prime minister Plaek Phibunsongkhram ordered the anthem to be played every day at 08:00 and 18:00 (8 AM and 6 PM), and ordered the populace to stand up to show respect for the nation. Nowadays, the morning and evening anthems correspond to the hoisting and lowering of the national flags in public areas (e.g. schools, workplaces, public buildings), respectively; hence, the anthem is broadcast by both radio and television channels twice per day from 1980's.

Current lyrics

Current usages

According to the practice dates from 1939s during the Plaek Phibunsongkhram era and The Flag Act of 1979, Thais must stop what they are doing and stand at attention to pay homage to the anthem played by all Thai media outlets, twice a day, at 08:00 and again at 18:00. Students in school stand in front of the raised flag and sing the national anthem at 08:00 every school day. while those who do not observe the custom by standing in silence during the anthem are subject to a fine of up to 2,000 baht and not more than one year in prison.

See also
 "Sansoen Phra Barami" (Thai national anthem before 1932, still used as the royal anthem)
 Thaification

Notes

References

External links

 Recordings of the National and Royal Anthem of Thailand and others honor musics from Thai Government Public Relations Department
 Thailand: Phleng Chat Thai - Audio of the national anthem of Thailand, with information and lyrics
 เพลงชาติไทย (Thai National Anthem)
  
 English lyrics to the Thai National Anthem
 A website dedicated to information on Thai National Anthem (Thai Language)

Thailand
National symbols of Thailand
Thai culture
Thai songs
Articles containing video clips
National anthems
National anthem compositions in C major